The Norristown High Speed Line (NHSL), also called the Purple Line, the P&W, or Route 100,) is a  interurban light rapid transit line operated by SEPTA, running between the 69th Street Transportation Center in Upper Darby and the Norristown Transportation Center in Norristown, Pennsylvania. Originally the Philadelphia and Western Railroad line, which is why the line is referred to by locals as "the P&W), the line runs entirely on its own right-of-way. By 2020, the Norristown Line had an average weekday ridership approaching 11,000 passengers.

The Norristown High Speed Line is unique in its combination of transportation technologies. Originally chartered as a Class I (steam) railroad, the line is fully grade separated, collects power from a third rail, and has high-level platforms common to rapid transit systems or commuter rail systems such as New York City's Long Island Rail Road and Metro-North Railroad, but has onboard fare collection, mostly single-car operation, and frequent stops more common to light rail systems.  Previously, the Norristown High Speed Line was considered to be a light rail line, according to a 2008 SEPTA budget report; however, the line is currently considered an interurban heavy rail line, according to a 2009 SEPTA business plan, and subsequent capital budgets. It has also been categorized by the American Public Transportation Association as "Intermodal High Speed rapid rail transit".

The purple color-coded line was formerly known simply as Route 100, but was officially changed to its current name in September 2009 as part of a customer service initiative by SEPTA. The line has been subject to multiple accidents in recent years. In August 2017, there was a crash involving an unoccupied railcar at 69th Street Terminal that injured more than 40 people. Another crash occurred near an Ardmore stop on January 26, 1987 injuring 19. The operator tested positive for drugs and was convicted on reckless endangerment. Another crash occurred on July 6, 2012 between Beachwood-Brookline and Penfield stations when the cars detached and came back together injuring 2.

History

The Norristown High Speed Line began service in 1907 as the Philadelphia and Western Railroad (P&W), which ran from the present 69th Street Terminal in Upper Darby, Pennsylvania to a converted farmhouse station in Strafford, Pennsylvania. When the newly built branch quickly attracted more ridership than the Strafford main line, the Norristown section became the main line and the Strafford stretch was demoted to branch status; in the mid-1930s, the Strafford spur was narrowed to a single track for its last  between the Wayne-St. Davids and Strafford stations, while the Norristown line received a sleek new art deco terminus at Main and Swede Streets.

Lehigh Valley connection
From Norristown, the P&W RR connected its tracks with the Lehigh Valley Transit Liberty Bell Route to provide direct electric train service from 69th St. Terminal to Allentown, Pennsylvania. However, in 1951, the Lehigh Valley Transit Company ended its service on the Liberty Bell Route, and in 1953 the company ended all its remaining rail service. Two years later, the P&W RR was taken over by the Philadelphia Suburban Transportation Company (PSTC), which was more popularly known as the Red Arrow Lines. In 1956, the Red Arrow abandoned the original branch between Villanova and Strafford, leaving only electric MU train service between 69th Street and Norristown, as it is today. Part of the Strafford branch right of way has been converted into the Radnor Trail. The PSTC was absorbed into SEPTA in 1970, eliminating the original railroad charter and immediately becoming the "Norristown High-Speed Line Trolley", officially known as Route 100.

Ridership
Ridership on the Norristown Line peaked in 2015 at 3,429,300. The previous peak came in 2014 with 3,147,209 trips. Prior to this modern escalation in ridership the line's ridership was highest in 1973 at 2.86 million annual linked trips, and again in 1980 with 2.579 million annual linked trips. Ridership statistics for fiscal years 2000 and later are from SEPTA annual service plans. Data for years 1972 to 1997 are from the SEPTA 1997 ridership census. There may be some discrepancy in how the ridership is reported since the annual service plans report total unlinked trips, while the ridership census uses linked trips, which may exclude passengers transferring from other lines.

21st century
Effective June 14, 2010, SEPTA changed the names of four stations to reflect the streets on which they were located. Township Line Road (formerly West Overbrook Station), Roberts Road (formerly Rosemont Station), Stadium – Ithan Avenue (formerly Stadium Station) and DeKalb Street (formerly King Manor Station).

In summer 2013, SEPTA closed the bridge (the Bridgeport Viaduct) carrying the Norristown High Speed Line over the Schuylkill River for four months. The bridge, which was built in 1911, had been deteriorating and needed to be rebuilt at a cost upwards of $30 million, though this repair project was budgeted at $7.5 million. As a result of closing the bridge, buses were used to transport passengers between the Bridgeport station and the Norristown Transportation Center. The bridge was reopened in November 2013. The remaining $30 million renovation of the entire bridge structure is currently unscheduled.

In 2021, SEPTA proposed rebranding their rail transit service as "SEPTA Metro", in order to make the system easier to navigate. Under this proposal, the Norristown High Speed Line will be rebranded as the "M" line (for "Montgomery", the county in which Norristown is located), with a purple color and numeric suffixes for service variants. The local service will be called the M1 Montgomery Local and the peak-hour express service will be called the M2 Montgomery Express. Had the proposed spur to King of Prussia, Pennsylvania been constructed, the proposal would have branded service utilizing the branch as the M3 Montgomery Local to KOP and the M4 Montgomery Express to KOP, providing service between 69th Street Transportation Center, and First & Moore/Valley Forge station, and the M5 Norristown / King of Prussia making local stops between First & Moore/Valley Forge station and Norristown Transportation Center. After a period of public comment, SEPTA revised its plans to primarily refer to the line as the "M Line," without number designations.

Service

The fare for a single ride as of January 2020 is $2.50 using cash or $2.00 using the Travel Wallet feature on a SEPTA Key card. Until September 1, 2014, the line used a "pay-as-you-exit" fare collection system on trains towards 69th Street Transportation Center. As part of a general change on several routes approaching 69th Street, passengers now pay onboard upon entering the train. Starting February 22, 2021, fares at 69th Street Transportation Center and Norristown Transportation Center are collected from station turnstiles at all times.

The service runs seven days a week from about 5AM to 1AM. Local trains from 69th Street to Norristown stop at all 22 stations, and the trip lasts approximately 32 minutes. Occasionally, local trains may run only between 69th Street and Bryn Mawr, stopping at ten stations, or 69th Street and Hughes Park, stopping at 18 stations.

During weekday peak periods (6:00–9:00 AM, 2:15–6:45 PM), the Norristown High Speed Line features express and limited services, which stop only at select stations, therefore decreasing travel time between 69th Street and Norristown. Norristown Express service, denoted by red destination signs,  travels between 69th Street and Norristown in approximately 22 minutes, stopping at only 16 stations. Norristown Limited service, denoted by blue destination signs,travels between 69th Street and Norristown in approximately 26 minutes, and stops at 8 stations.  All trains share the same two tracks, so a limited leaving Norristown, for example, will be immediately followed by a local, which stops at more stations, and therefore is spaced farther from the previous train. The next limited will catch up with it. Similarly, a local may leave Bryn Mawr right after an express stops there, and gets to 69th Street just before the next express or limited catches up with it.

A former Hughes Park Express service, was denoted by green destination signs, traveled nonstop from 69th Street to Beechwood–Brookline, and made all stops from there to Hughes Park in approximately 22 minutes.

Station list
Before December 7, 2020, if passengers wanted to board the train at the station, they would have to press a button on the platform, which turns on a light that tells the engineer to stop at the station. The train would only stop if it was scheduled to stop at the station; otherwise, trains did not stop even if the passenger pressed the button. All trains stopped at terminals.

After December 7, 2020, if passengers want to board the train at the station they have to be physically visible to the engineer for the train to stop. This is the same as on a light rail or tram/trolley line. In both cases detraining passengers must press a button on board to request the train to stop.

King of Prussia Spur

In 2013, it was proposed to create a branch off the Norristown High Speed Line to serve the King of Prussia Mall, Valley Forge office parks, and the Valley Forge Casino Resort. Many possible routes were planned for this extension, including one following US 202 from Norristown to King of Prussia, another following a utility right-of-way paralleling US 202 and the Pennsylvania Turnpike, and another following the utility right-of-way and Gulph Road. In 2014, SEPTA estimated that the expansion would cost between $500 million to $650 million, and was at least eight years away.

On February 29, 2016, SEPTA announced the preferred route based on cost-efficiency and environmental impact. The route would have branched off from the main Norristown High Speed Line between Hughes Park and DeKalb Street, followed a PECO transmission line right-of-way to the Pennsylvania Turnpike, and then run parallel to the Turnpike to reach the King of Prussia Mall. It would then have followed Mall Boulevard before crossing the Turnpike and following First Avenue. Stations would have been located at Henderson Road, Allendale Road, Mall Boulevard, the intersection of First and Clark Avenues in the King of Prussia Business Park, and at First Avenue near the Valley Forge Casino Resort.

On January 25, 2018, the SEPTA board approved a final route alignment, selecting the locally preferred routing from among the options studied in the project's draft environmental impact statement (EIS).  The  line was estimated to cost between $1 billion and $1.2 billion, with ridership estimated at 9,500 daily by 2040. In January, 2019, SEPTA engaged the engineering firm HNTB to design Phase I of the project. On December 1, 2020, SEPTA held a meeting to update the proposed alignment. The final environmental impact statement was planned to be submitted to the Federal Transit Administration (FTA) in early 2021. Construction on the spur to King of Prussia was projected to cost $2 billion and service was expected to begin between 2025 and 2027. 

Five new stations were to be added to the line as follows:
 Henderson Road station
 Allendale Road station 
 Mall Boulevard station
 First & American Forge station
 First & Moore/Valley Forge station (terminus)

On March 17, 2023, SEPTA stopped work on the extension of the Norristown High Speed Line to King of Prussia after determining it would not have the money to proceed forward after the FTA denied  a capital grant to the project.

See also 

 Electroliner
 Medium-capacity rail transport system

Notes

References

External links

 
  
  

600 V DC railway electrification
1907 establishments in Pennsylvania
Interurban railways in Pennsylvania
Radnor Township, Delaware County, Pennsylvania
Rapid transit in Pennsylvania
SEPTA
Standard gauge railways in the United States